Johanna Kruse (born 19 April 1992) is a German boxer and kickboxer.  She is the current ISKA World K-1 Light Welterweight champion.

Martial arts career

Kickboxing career
During Explosion Fight Night 8, Kruse fought for the ISKA European Light Welterweight Freestyle title against Cindy Perros. Kruse would ultimately lose a unanimous decision.

During the inaugural It's Fight Time event, Kruse fought for the ISKA World Light Welterweight K-1 title against Sarah Glandien. Kruse won the title by a second-round KO.

Kruse fought for the Enfusion 67 kg title against Dolly McBean during Enfusion 64. McBean won a unanimous decision. She challenged for the title again during Enfusion 73, against Sarah Gobel. Kruse won the title by a unanimous decision. Her first defense of the title was during Enfusion 84, against Sheena Widdershoven. Kruse lost the fight, and the title, by a decision.

Boxing career
Johanna Kruse made her boxing debut in March 2018, with a TKO win over Teodora Vidic. She has since fought four more times, and has ended each of her fights by TKO. Kruse is ranked as the #18 Super Welterweight by BoxRec, as of June 2020.

Championships and accomplishments
International Sport Karate Association
ISKA World K-1 Light Welterweight Championship
Enfusion
Enfusion 67 kg World Championship

Kickboxing record

|- 
|-  bgcolor="#FFBBBB"
| 5 Apr 2019|| Loss||align=left| Sheena Widdershoven || Enfusion 84 || Eindhoven, Netherlands || Decision (Unanimous) || 5 || 2:00
|-
! style=background:white colspan=9 |
|-
|-  bgcolor="#CCFFCC"
| 27 Oct 2018|| Win||align=left| Sarah Gobel || Enfusion 73 || Oberhausen, Germany || Decision (Unanimous) || 5 || 2:00
|-
! style=background:white colspan=9 |
|-
|-  bgcolor="#FFBBBB"
| 20 Apr 2018|| Loss||align=left| Dolly McBean || Enfusion 64 || Oberhausen, Germany || Decision (Unanimous) || 5 || 2:00
|-
! style=background:white colspan=9 |
|-
|-  bgcolor="#CCFFCC"
| 7 Oct 2017|| Win||align=left| Deniz Batinli || Enfusion 54 || Ludwigsburg, Germany || Decision (Unanimous) || 3 || 3:00
|-
|-  bgcolor="#FFBBBB"
| 3 Dec 2016|| Loss||align=left| Kaitlin Young || Mix Fight Gala XX || Frankfurt, Germany || Decision (Split) || 3 || 3:00
|-
|-  bgcolor="#c5d2ea"
| 12 Sep 2015|| Draw||align=left| Sarah Debaieb || It's Fight Time 2 || Darmstadt, Germany || Decision (Unanimous) || 3 || 3:00
|-
|-  bgcolor="#CCFFCC"
| 15 Jun 2015|| Win||align=left| Sarah Glandien || It's Fight Time || Germany || KO (Punch) || 2 || 
|-
! style=background:white colspan=9 |
|-
|-  bgcolor="#CCFFCC"
| 12 May 2015|| Win||align=left| He Qun || Mix Fight Gala 19 || Germany || TKO (Punches and kicks) || 2 || 
|-
|-  bgcolor="#FFBBBB"
| 16 Nov 2013|| Loss||align=left| Cindy Perros || Explosion Fight Night 8 || Brest, France || Decision (Unanimous) || 3 || 3:00
|-
! style=background:white colspan=9 |
|-
|-  bgcolor="#FFBBBB"
| 1 Sep 2012|| Loss||align=left| Larissa Kung ||  Mix Fight Gala 13 || Frankfurt, Germany || TKO (Punches) || 2 || 
|-
|-
| colspan=9 | Legend:

Professional boxing record

See also
List of female kickboxers

List of female boxers

External links
 Johanna Kruse at Awakening FIghters
 Johanna Kruse at Boxrec

References 

German female kickboxers
German women boxers
1992 births
Living people
Sportspeople from Cologne